There were eleven Independent candidates in the 1953 Manitoba provincial election.  One of these, Stephen Juba, was elected.  Some of these candidates have separate biography pages; information about others may be found here.

The 1953 Manitoba election was determined by instant-runoff voting in most constituencies. Three constituencies (Winnipeg Centre, Winnipeg North and Winnipeg South) returned four members by the single transferable vote (STV), with a 20% quota for election.  St. Boniface elected two members by STV, with a 33% quota.

Leon W. Michalchuk (Fisher)
Michalchuk first campaigned for the Manitoba legislature in the 1941 provincial election, as an Independent Coalitionist.  He lost to Liberal-Progressive incumbent Nicholas Bachynsky in Fisher by only 33 votes.  He ran again in the 1945 election as a Cooperative Commonwealth Federation candidate, and again finished a close second against Bachynsky.

He ran as an Independent in the 1953 election, and once again finished second against Bachynsky with 705 votes (26.97%).  Bachynsky was declared elected on the first count.  Michalchuk later alleged ballot irregularities.

John Firman (Gimli)
Firman finished third out of three candidates with 194 votes (5.86%).  Liberal-Progressive candidate Steinn O. Thompson was elected on the first count.

Steve Melnyk (Kildonan—Transcona)
Melnyk was elected to the Transcona council in the 1952 municipal election, defeating two incumbent candidates to secure the second of two positions.  Although he ran as an independent in 1953, he was supported by the local Progressive Conservative association.

He finished fourth out of four candidates in the general election with 820 votes (6.78%).  The winner was Russell Paulley of the Cooperative Commonwealth Federation.

Harry Shewman (Morris)
Shewman placed first on the first count with 1,528 votes (42.89%), and was declared elected on transfers.  He later joined the Progressive Conservative Party.

John A. Mabon (Mountain)
Mabon was a farmer in Neelin, Manitoba.  He was elected Reeve of Argyles without opposition in 1951, and formally took the position in early 1952.  Previously, he served on the local council for several years, and had been defeated for reeve on two occasions by Walter Clark.

On May 30, 1953, the Winnipeg Free Press reported that Mabon had allegedly sought support for his candidacy from the local Progressive Conservative association, and received a strongly worded letter in response indicating that no support would be forthcoming.  He had previously been known as a supporter of the Liberal-Progressive Party.

Mabon finished third with 399 votes (12.69%).  The winner was incumbent Ivan Schultz of the Liberal-Progressive Party.

Charles Leo Abbott (Rupertsland)
Abbott was a clergyman.  He ran for the House of Commons of Canada in the 1945 federal election as an Independent candidate in Springfield, and finished a distant sixth place against Liberal candidate John Sinnott with 231 votes.  In 1953, he finished third out of three candidates with 186 votes (8.07%).  Liberal-Progressive candidate Roy Brown was declared the winner on the second count.

George E. Scalf (Swan River)
Scalf was the Mayor of Swan River at the time of the election.  He initially sought the nomination of the Social Credit Party, but lost it to Delbert L. Downs.  He was a late entry to the race as an independent.

Scalf received 184 votes (3.81%), finishing fourth.  The winner was George Renouf of the Progressive Conservative Party of Manitoba.

Stephen Juba (Winnipeg Centre)
Juba received 3,619 votes (17.59%) in this four-member constituency, finished second, and was declared elected on the eighth count.  During the campaign, he claimed to be "Free and uncontrolled by political ties or that of any other special interests".  See his biography page for further information.

Lewis Stubbs (Winnipeg Centre)
Stubbs served as a Member of the Legislative Assembly from 1936 to 1949, sitting as an independent member.  He finished fifth in Winnipeg Centre with 1,741 votes (8.46%), and was eliminated on the tenth and final count.  In the 1953 campaign, he used the slogan, "Champion of Human Rights and Social Justice".  See his biography page for further information.

E.L. Colson (Winnipeg Centre)
Colson was a thirty-year-old dentist at the time of the 1953 election.  He ran as the running mate of Stephen Juba in the four-member constituency of Winnipeg Centre.

Although Juba and Colson were given equal billing in advertisements, Juba was clearly the dominant figure in the campaign.  Colson received only 63 votes (0.31%), finishing last in a field of fourteen candidates.  Juba finished second, and was declared elected on the eighth count.

John Zuzyk (Winnipeg North)
Zuzyk supported free medical and dental care for pensioners, and argued that the main parties lacked progressive ideas.  He finished eleven out of eleven candidates on the first count with 138 votes (0.64%), and was eliminated after the second count with 139 votes.

1953